17α-Dihydroequilin, or α-dihydroequilin, also known as 7-dehydro-17α-estradiol, as well as estra-1,3,5(10),7-tetraene-3,17α-diol, is a naturally occurring steroidal estrogen found in horses which is closely related to equilin, equilenin, and 17α-estradiol. The compound, as the 3-sulfate ester sodium salt, is present in conjugated estrogens (Premarin), a pharmaceutical extract of the urine of pregnant mares, and is the third highest quantity constituent in the formulation (13.8%). The compound has been studied clinically.

See also 
 List of estrogens § Equine estrogens

References 

Secondary alcohols
Estranes
Estrogens